Daria Pająk (born 11 January 1993) is a competitive bowler on the Professional Women's Bowling Association (PWBA) Tour in the United States. Following early bowling success in Poland, Pająk moved to the United States in 2012, eventually going professional and earning PWBA 2017 Rookie of the Year. Currently she is a pro staff member for 900 Global, Turbo Grips, and Logo Infusion.

Youth and education 
Born in Piła to parents Bozena and Miroslaw Pająk, she was 6 years old when the first bowling facility opened in Poznań in 1999. Daria won the National Youth Championship at age 11 and was selected to represent Poland in the European Youth Championship.  Pająk had won every major championship in Poland, both youth and adult, by age 16.

She worked with coach Costas Mitsingas before attending Webber International University in Babson Park, Florida, in 2012. During four years of college Pająk was a part of a team who won the NAIA championship twice and the Intercollegiate Team Championship, the biggest title of college bowling.

Career 
After college Pająk participated in a few tournaments on the PWBA Tour and PBA Tour. Daria performed well enough that some bowling companies signed her as a pro staff athlete. She qualified second for the USBC Queens, made match play at the U.S. Women's Open, and finished in the top eight at the PBA World Series of Bowling Cheetah Championship.

Finding success in the professional scene, she applied for a pro card and bowl on the PWBA Tour professionally. She won her first PWBA title in the 2017 PWBA Greater Detroit Open and finished second to USBC Hall of Famer Liz Johnson in the U.S. Women's Open.

She was named PWBA Rookie of the Year in 2017.

In 2018, she continued the PWBA tour in the United States, and also appeared in some European Bowling Tour (EBT) tournaments.

In June 2021, Pajak was invited to participate in the PBA King of the Lanes: Empress Edition event that was televised nationally in the US on Fox Sports 1. She won her first challenge match and held the Empress position for two more rounds, earning $25,000.

In popular culture
Pająk (and this Wikipedia page about her) was namedropped in the fourth season of What We Do in the Shadows, during the 2022 "Pine Barrens" episode.

References 

Living people
1993 births
Polish bowling players